The Fornacher Redlbach is a river of Upper Austria.

West of Vöcklamarkt it joins the Vöckla, which itself joins the Ager. The river is partly untreated, partly modulated with backwater area. Thanks to its excellent water quality it is rich in trout.

References

External links

Rivers of Upper Austria
Rivers of Austria